"" ("We, We, We") is the national anthem of Vanuatu. It was written and composed by François Vincent Ayssav (born 1955) and adopted by the citizens of Vanuatu in 1980.

Lyrics

References

External links 
 Alternate English translation
 Partnersinrhyme
 The anthem sung at the 40th anniversary of independence celebrations

National anthems
Vanuatuan music
National symbols of Vanuatu
Oceanian anthems
Year of song missing
National anthem compositions in C major
Bislama words and phrases